The Hidden Hero is a 1980 South Korean film directed by Im Kwon-taek. It was chosen as Best Film at the Grand Bell Awards.

Synopsis
An anti-communist film about a reporter torn between political ideologies during the days after the Korean liberation from Japan.

Cast
 Hah Myung-joong
 Kim Young-ae 
 Go Doo-shim 
 Song Jae-ho 
 Joo Hyun 
 Yoon Yang-ha 
 Kim Hee-ra 
 Lee Ill-woong 
 Lee Jong-man 
 Park Am

Bibliography

Notes

External links 

1980 films
Films directed by Im Kwon-taek
1980s Korean-language films
South Korean drama films
Best Picture Grand Bell Award winners